Rubén Procopio (born November 21, 1961) is an American animation and comic book artist, animator and sculptor. Long affiliated with Walt Disney Feature Animation as an animator and sculptor, Rubén is credited with restoring the maquette process to feature animation film production in the early 1980s.  He is the founder of Masked Avenger Studios, whose clients include Walt Disney Studios, Warner Bros. Studios, New Line Cinema, Cartoon Network, Electric Tiki and DC Comics.  He is known for his versatile sculpting and illustration style in both cartoony and realistic characters, with an emphasis on Disney characters, superheroes, and the masked heroes of yesteryear.

Early life
Procopio was born in Buenos Aires, Argentina in 1961.  His parents, émigrés of Italian origin, went to Los Angeles when he was four years old and his father, Adolfo Procopio, began an acclaimed 35-year career as a Walt Disney Imagineering sculptor whose works can be seen in Disney theme parks worldwide.

A seminal moment in Procopio's childhood was when he read Alex Toth's Super Friends DC Treasury process of TV Animation. Later in life, Toth became one of Procopio's close friends.

Procopio's artistic development was guided through daily drawing assignments from his father.  His early dedication and discipline earned him scholarships to Cal Arts and Art Center College of Design, followed by the opportunity to join Walt Disney Feature Animation at age 18.

Career
Joining Walt Disney Productions in 1980, Procopio was trained under Eric Larson, one of Disney's legendary "Nine Old Men," and other Disney veterans.

From the 1980s through the early 2000s, Procopio contributed his varied 2D and 3D talents to more than 25 feature films produced in Disney's California and Florida studios, several of which received Academy Award nominations.

Over this time, Procopio worked as an animator, artistic supervisor, head of department, character designer, story-board artist, video game supervisor, and maquette sculptor, in addition to being credited with restoring the maquette art form to the film production process.  He also served as an international ambassador for Disney promoting its films, and was dispatched by Roy Disney to oversee construction of the Walt Disney Monument in Madrid, Spain.  His Ursula maquette from The Little Mermaid holds a place in the Smithsonian Institution permanent collection.

In 2003, inspired by his lifelong admiration of the masked heroes of yesteryear, Procopio founded Masked Avenger Studios, specializing in sculpture, animation and design.  Procopio's father Adolfo and sister Vivian also participate in Masked Avenger Studios to offer its clients more than 60 years of combined artistic experience and talent to numerous major motion picture, animation and television studios, comic book publishers, and manufacturers and designers of toys and collectible statues. 
  
Procopio is a key contributor to the award-winning Walt Disney Classics Collection, bringing Disney characters to life through three-dimensional porcelain sculptures and promoting the products through gallery appearances.  His works include Elastigirl and Edna Mode from The Incredibles, Ursula from The Little Mermaid, Genie from Aladdin, Chernabog and the 2006 Signature Series Magical Maelstrom from Fantasia (for which Procopio animated the brooms and pails of water before sculpting them), and several pieces in the Pirates of the Caribbean series.

Procopio also developed, with Electric Tiki Design, the Classic Heroes line of collectible statues, which includes such characters as The Phantom, The Green Hornet and Kato, Dick Tracy, The Lone Ranger, Zorro, Flash Gordon, The Tick, Mandrake the Magician, Prince Valiant, Tarzan and Lassie. In their Teeny Weeny line he has sculpted such memorable characters as Mighty Mouse, Woody Woodpecker, Popeye, Mr. Magoo, Rocky and Bullwinkle, Andy Panda and Chilly Willy, and in 2006 sculpted the new "Sergio" award for the Comic Art Professional Society, named for its founder, Sergio Aragonés.  When he steps from his sculpting table to his drawing board, he illustrates comic books and graphic novels, including works featuring his original characters Chameleonman and Goliath. His father Adolfo and sister Vivian are the inspiration for the characters in the Chameleonman comic series.

Procopio is fluent in Spanish and Italian, and enjoys international correspondence with artist community colleagues and fans.  His sister Vivian, who contributes her design and project management talents, also enjoyed a long career as a Research Administrator in the Walt Disney Feature Animation Research Library.

Filmography
The Plastic Man Comedy/Adventure Show (1979)
The Fox and The Hound (1981) (uncredited)
The Black Cauldron (1985)
The Great Mouse Detective (1986)
Who Framed Roger Rabbit (1988) (uncredited)
Oliver & Company (1988) (uncredited)
The Little Mermaid (1989)
The Prince and the Pauper (1990)
The Rescuers Down Under (1990)
Beauty and the Beast (1991)
Aladdin (1992)
Trail Mix-Up (1993)
The Lion King (1994)
Pocahontas (1995)
The Hunchback of Notre Dame (1996)
Mulan (1998)
Tarzan (1999)
Atlantis: The Lost Empire (2001)
Lorenzo (2004)
Home on the Range (2004)
Tom and Jerry's Giant Adventure (2013)
Ben 10: Omniverse (2014) (Storyboard Artist - 2 Episodes) 
Tom and Jerry: Spy Quest (2015)
Tom and Jerry: Willy Wonka and the Chocolate Factory (2015)
Batman: Return of the Caped Crusaders (2016) (Storyboard Artist)
Lego Scooby-Doo! Blowout Beach Bash (2017) (Storyboard Artist)
Batman vs. Two-Face (2017) (Storyboard Artist)
Scooby-Doo! & Batman: The Brave and the Bold (2018) (Storyboard Artist)

Other work
Cranium Command (1989; theme park attraction at Epcot at Walt Disney World Resort);
Disney's Aladdin (1993; video game);
The Lion King (1994; video game) (special thanks);
"Name's Hades, Lord of the Dead" Hades, Walt Disney Classics Collection; 
Ursula at Vanity:  Devilish Diva, Ursula, Walt Disney Classics Collection; 
"Drink Up, Me 'earties!" Pirate With Pigs, Walt Disney Classics Collection; 
"A Pirate's Life For Me" Pirate on Archway, Walt Disney Classics Collection; 
Lockjaw, Marvel/Bowen; 
Hellboy, Classic Hereoes – Electric Tiki; 
Shazam, DC Direct; 
Phantom, Classic Heroes – Electric Tiki;
The Lone Ranger, Classic Heroes – Electric Tiki; 
Lassie, Classic Heroes – Electric Tiki; 
Zorro, Classic Heroes – Electric Tiki;
Mighty Mouse – Teeny Weeny Series – Electric Tiki; 
Comic Art Professionals Society “Sergio” Award;
Cover, Alter Ego #63 [Alex Toth edition], December 2006;
Cover and story with Ron Marz, First American Phantom Annual, Moonstone Comics;
Illustrator, The Phantom Chronicles, Moonstone Books;
Author, The Phantom Chronicles Artist's Annex, Moonstone Books and Masked Avenger Studios;
Interior Illustrator, Tales of Zorro, Moonstone Books
Batman'66 Issue #5, DC Comics; (Artist)
Batman'66 Issue #8, DC Comics; (Artist)
Batman'66 Issue #20, DC Comics; (Artist)

References

External links
Masked Avenger Studios website
Masked Avenger Studios

Living people
1961 births
American animators
Argentine animators
Artists from Buenos Aires
American comics artists
American sculptors
Argentine comics artists
Argentine sculptors
American storyboard artists
Argentine storyboard artists